Sebago Lake is an unincorporated village in the town of Standish, Cumberland County, Maine, United States. The community is located on the south shore of its eponymous lake at the junction of Maine State Route 35 and Maine State Route 114. Sebago Lake has a post office with ZIP code 04075.

References

Villages in Cumberland County, Maine
Villages in Maine